Baby Webb was an American Negro league first baseman between 1908 and 1910.

Webb made his Negro leagues debut in 1908 with the San Antonio Black Bronchos and played with the club again the following season. He went on to play for the Oklahoma Monarchs in 1910. In 13 recorded career games, he posted eight hits in 51 plate appearances.

References

External links
Baseball statistics and player information from Baseball-Reference Black Baseball Stats and Seamheads

Year of birth missing
Year of death missing
Place of birth missing
Place of death missing
Oklahoma Monarchs players
San Antonio Black Bronchos players